Fresh Hare is a Warner Bros. Merrie Melodies cartoon directed by Friz Freleng, written by Michael Maltese, and produced by Leon Schlesinger. It was released to theatres on August 22, 1942.

Plot
In this short, the rotund early-1940s version of Elmer Fudd is portrayed as a Mountie, earnestly attempting to arrest Bugs Bunny, who is, according to several posters attached to forest trees, wanted dead or alive (preferably dead). After following the rabbit tracks to a burrow, Elmer tries to lure Bugs out with a carrot; this works, at least with Bugs' hand, and Elmer initially succeeds in getting a handcuff around the rabbit's wrist. Somehow, though, Bugs works his arm free of the cuff – out of sight in his burrow – and attaches a bomb in its place. Elmer, attached to the bomb via the other handcuff, panics when he pulls it from the burrow.  He frantically searches for his keys, only to find that Bugs has them and, leaning against a nearby tree, is nonchalantly twirling them around his finger while munching a carrot.  He then deliberately takes his time going through each and every key, and does not find the correct one until the moment the bomb explodes offscreen. Elmer, who remains completely unharmed, tells Bugs that he has been found guilty of committing a litany of crimes. The crimes (corrected here for Elmer's rounded-l-and-r speech) are listed below:

"Resisting an officer, assault and battery, trespassing, disturbing the peace, miscellaneous misdemeanors, public nuisance, traffic violations, going through a boulevard stop, jaywalking, triple parking, conduct unbecoming to a rabbit", and (once again) "violating traffic regulations."

As Elmer reads, Bugs takes his Mountie hat and impersonates a superior officer: "Attention! Why, look at you! You call yourself a Mountie! You're a disgrace to the regiment! I'm gonna drum you out of the service!" He then tears off Elmer's uniform, revealing a tightened corset and polka-dot undershorts.

When Elmer realizes he's been tricked, he begins to give chase - after pausing to put his miraculously refurbished uniform back on. The chase eventually involves a path beneath the snow, which ends abruptly when Elmer runs into a pine tree. The impact causes all the snow to fall off the tree, which reveals Christmas decorations, and Elmer emerges from underneath with snow on his face that gives him a Santa Claus appearance. The song Jingle Bells plays in the background, and Bugs says to the astonished Elmer, "Merry Christmas, Santy!" and burrows his way out of Elmer's path.

Elmer rediscovers Bugs's footprints and follows them; he finds Bugs taunting a snow effigy of Elmer the Mountie. Bugs announces he is going to punch it square in the nose, saying Elmer can't catch him, let alone catch a cold. Elmer has crept up behind Bugs and is tapping his foot, waiting to catch the rabbit by surprise. However, as Bugs finishes his wind-up for the punch, he turns around at the last moment and slugs the real Elmer square in the nose, propelling him backward into an ice-wall and revealing a heart with an arrow through it. Bugs again burrows away.

After some more hijinks and another failed chase, a weeping Elmer gives up and labels himself as a "disgwace to the wegiment" for failing to catch the rabbit since he is a disgrace to the regiment (alluding to Bugs' earlier statement), at which point Bugs willingly turns himself in. At headquarters, Bugs is blindfolded and sentenced to death by firing squad (despite the fact that most of his alleged crimes were essentially misdemeanors). As the firing squad prepares to execute Bugs, Elmer tells him that he can make one last wish, which prompts Bugs to say, "I wish, I wish," and to break into the song "Dixie". The scene then, in a non sequitur, transitions into a minstrel show in the south (a commonly censored scene on televised airings of this short), where Elmer, Bugs and the firing squad, now all in blackface, perform the chorus of "Camptown Races", with Bugs on banjo and Elmer on tambourine, to which Bugs asks the audience, "Fantastic, isn't it?"

Edited prints
The last scene of the short was edited on multiple channels in multiple ways. On Cartoon Network and TNT, a fade-iris goes out fast enough after Bugs begins singing Dixie. On TBS, the ending audio of the short stays intact but, while it plays, it repeatedly keeps playing Bugs breaking into Dixie multiple times until the soundtrack ends as the iris fades out.

In 2003, WVTV Channel 18 in Milwaukee, Wisconsin aired the short unedited during a public domain cartoon program, without any advance warning.

Home media
 Because the cartoon is in the public domain, this cartoon has been widely available on numerous low-cost, unauthorized public domain VHS tapes and DVDs, and on internet streaming services, most in poor quality, like a VHS condition. And also viewed with its uncensored ending.
 This short is available as a bonus feature of the Captains of the Clouds DVD release.

References

External links

 
 
 Fresh Hare in the Big Cartoon Database
 Fresh Hare on the Internet Archive

 

1942 films
1942 short films
1942 comedy films
1942 animated films
1940s animated short films
1940s Warner Bros. animated short films
Merrie Melodies short films
Bugs Bunny films
Elmer Fudd films
Royal Canadian Mounted Police in fiction
Film controversies
African-American-related controversies in film
Race-related controversies in film
Race-related controversies in animation
Blackface minstrel shows and films
Films set in Canada
Short films directed by Friz Freleng
Films produced by Leon Schlesinger
Films scored by Carl Stalling
Films with screenplays by Michael Maltese
Warner Bros. Cartoons animated short films
1940s English-language films